Kapuwela Vidanage Senanayake Mudiyanselage Jayani Chamathka Dharmadasa Senanayake (born as ජයනි සේනානායක; February 1, 1974), popularly as Jayani Senanayake, is an actress in Sri Lankan cinema, theater and television. Highly versatile actress in drama and comedy, she is best known for the roles in films Sulang Kirilli, Walapatala and Goal.

Personal life
Senanayake started education from Sri Sumangala Maha Vidyalaya, Anuradhapura. Then she went to Dhammdinna Vidyalaya, Galkulama and finally completed from Niwanthakachethiya Vidyalaya, Anuradhapura.

Acting career
She started to act in stage drama while at the school, where she won the award for the best actress in North Central Drama festival. Then, Senanayake joined with M. Dharmasena to act in his play Wera. Her major breakthrough in theater came under Wasantha Dukgannarala during university times.

Her maiden cinematic experience came through 2001 film Mathu Yam Dawasa directed by Dharmasena Pathiraja.

Selected television serials

 Ado
 Anavaratha 
 Angani 
 Arungal
 Bogala Sawundiris 
 Chalo
 Chandi Kumarihami 
 Dhawala Kanya 
 Dhawala Yamaya
 Diya Yata Gini
 Ehipillamak Yata  
 Isisara Isawwa
 Jeewithaya Horu Aran 
 Kampitha Vil
 Maya Roo
 Me Wasantha Kalayay
 Meeduma (2003)
 Meedum Amma
 Nonimi Yathra 
Paara Wasaa Aetha
Pateelage Kathawa
 Pinkama (single episode)
 Rathi Virathi 
 Sadgunakaraya 
 Sadisi Tharanaya
 Sanda Amawakai
 Sedona
 Sihinayak Wage 
 Sindu Kiyana Una Pandura
 Siyapath Arama
 Suddilage Kathawa 
 Sulanga Maha Meraka
 Tharu Ahasata Adarei
 Three-wheel Malli 
 Wara Peraliya 
 Weeraya Gedara Awith
 Weten Eha

Selected stage dramas

 Bakamuna Weedi Basi 
 Debiddo
Horu Samaga Heluwen 
 Miss Yulee
 Saadaya Maarai Salli Hamarai
 Sihina Horu Aran
 Siriwardena Pawula
 Weeraya Merila 
 Wera

Filmography

Awards and accolades
She has won several awards at the local stage drama festivals and television festivals.

Bunka Cultural Awards

|-
|| 2009 ||| Performance in Drama || Honour Award ||

Sumathi Awards

|-
|| 2013 ||| Me Wasantha Kalayay || Merit Award ||

References

External links

Living people
Sri Lankan film actresses
1974 births